Harold Clark may refer to:

 Gene Clark (Harold Eugene Clark, 1944–1991), American singer-songwriter
 Harold L. Clark (1893–1973), U. S. Air Force brigadier general who designed Randolph Air Force Base
 Harold M. Clark (1890–1919), U.S. Army Signal Corps soldier and the namesake of Clark Air Base in the Philippines
 Harold W. Clark (1891–1986), American creationist

See also
 Harold Clarke (disambiguation)
 Harry Clark (disambiguation)
 William Harold Clark (1869–1913), Canadian politician